Esther Township is a township in Polk County, Minnesota, United States. It is part of the Grand Forks-ND-MN Metropolitan Statistical Area. The population was 158 at the 2000 census.

Esther Township was named for Esther Cleveland, daughter of Grover and Frances Cleveland.

Geography

Demographics
As of the census of 2000, there were 158 people, 59 households, and 45 families residing in the township. The population density was 8.3 people per square mile (3.2/km2). There were 63 housing units at an average density of 3.3/sq mi (1.3/km2). The racial makeup of the township was 99.37% White and 0.63% African American.

There were 59 households, out of which 27.1% had children under the age of 18 living with them, 69.5% were married couples living together, 1.7% had a female householder with no husband present, and 23.7% were non-families. 20.3% of all households were made up of individuals, and 5.1% had someone living alone who was 65 years of age or older. The average household size was 2.68 and the average family size was 3.07.

In the township the population was spread out, with 21.5% under the age of 18, 7.6% from 18 to 24, 25.3% from 25 to 44, 29.1% from 45 to 64, and 16.5% who were 65 years of age or older. The median age was 40 years. For every 100 females, there were 125.7 males. For every 100 females age 18 and over, there were 138.5 males.

The median income for a household in the township was $46,563, and the median income for a family was $55,625. Males had a median income of $25,938 versus $15,625 for females. The per capita income for the township was $20,997. About 7.0% of families and 8.6% of the population were below the poverty line, including 13.3% of those under the age of eighteen and none of those 65 or over.

References

Townships in Polk County, Minnesota
Townships in Minnesota